"When a Blind Man Cries" is a song by British rock band Deep Purple, originally only available as the B-side of the single "Never Before", released in 1972. It was recorded during the Machine Head sessions in December 1971.

According to Ian Gillan, "It’s just an example, for example, if you think of the phrase 'if a blind man cries' then it's pretty sad, those who are disadvantaged tend to be less complaining than those who are able-bodied".

Live performances
Because guitarist Ritchie Blackmore disliked "When a Blind Man Cries", the band never played the song live during his stay with the band, with the exception of one occasion, on 6 April 1972 in Quebec, Canada, when Blackmore was ill, and Randy California from Spirit stood in for him. Ian Gillan performed the song frequently in the early 1990s.

When Joe Satriani replaced Blackmore during The Battle Rages On... tour in November 1993, "When a Blind Man Cries" joined the setlist as early as 5 December 1993. The song has become a staple live performance ever since, and has appeared on most of the live albums the band has released with Steve Morse.

After Steve Morse joined the band, the song is usually extended to around seven minutes when performed in concert with him, while the original song was only three minutes in length.

In addition, the song has also been released on the Gillan's Inn CD/DVD by Ian Gillan, featuring blind guitarist Jeff Healey.

In 2023, the song returned to their setlist with new guitarist Simon McBride.

Personnel
Ian Gillan – vocals
Ritchie Blackmore – guitar
Jon Lord – keyboards
Roger Glover – bass guitar
Ian Paice – drums

Covers
The song was covered by Axel Rudi Pell for the 1991 album Nasty Reputation.

In 1999, Richie Sambora of Bon Jovi appeared as a guest musician on a Stuart Smith album Stuart Smith’s Heaven and Earth performing a cover of this song.

Gary Barden covered the song for his 2011 cover album Rock n' Roll My Soul.

Metallica covered the song for Re-Machined: A Tribute to Deep Purple's Machine Head. It also appears in the third (bonus) disc of the album Hardwired... to Self-Destruct.

Turbo recorded a cover on the Awatar album. Along with "Neon Knight" they were the only songs sung in English on the album.

References

Deep Purple songs
1972 songs
Songs written by Ian Gillan
Songs written by Roger Glover
Songs written by Ritchie Blackmore
Songs written by Jon Lord
Songs written by Ian Paice
Blues rock songs
Rock ballads
Warner Records singles